Hokokwito (also, Hococwedoc and Hok-ok-wi-dok) is a former Miwok settlement in Mariposa County, California.

It was located in Yosemite Valley, opposite Yosemite Falls.

References

Miwok villages
Former Native American populated places in the Sierra Nevada (United States)
Former settlements in Mariposa County, California
Yosemite National Park
Former populated places in California